Al-Mahawil Sport Club, is an Iraqi football team based in Al-Mahawil, Babil, that plays in the Iraq Division Three.

Managerial history
 Hassan Jawad
 Muhannad Raddam

See also
 2021–22 Iraq FA Cup

References

External links
 Al-Mahawil SC on Goalzz.com
 Iraq Clubs- Foundation Dates

1991 establishments in Iraq
Association football clubs established in 1991
Football clubs in Babil